The Bizzarrini Strada (also 5300 GT Strada and 5300 GT), is a sports car produced by Bizzarrini from 1964 to 1968.  Sold as an exceptionally low slung 2-seat coupe, roadster, and track-tuned "Corsa" racer, it proved to be Bizzarrini's most successful model.

History
Designed by ex-Ferrari chief engineer Giotto Bizzarrini in 1963, the Strada was launched by his company in 1964. It was similar in concept to the Iso Grifo, also designed by Bizzarrini, and even used the Grifo name while in the planning stage, as well as the welded unibody platform of the Iso Rivolta 300.

The engine was intentionally placed as far back over the front axle as possible, to improve weight distribution and handling. In later models, the 5,358 cc engine was replaced by a larger 7,000 cc unit, fitted with a Holley carburetor.

Dunlop four-wheel disc brakes, a BorgWarner T-10 four-speed manual transmission, de Dion tube rear suspension, and limited slip differential were also used. The Giorgetto Giugiaro influenced Bertone styled aluminum body, was striking in its day and still regarded in the 21st century as "gorgeous" and an "absolute masterpiece". Three spyder versions were also built, including a prototype which was a full convertible and two production versions which featured removable T-tops.

In 1965, a Bizzarrini Grifo won its class at Le Mans and finished ninth overall.

A total of 133 examples were produced from 1964 through 1968.

See also
 Ferrari Daytona
 Lamborghini Miura
 Maserati Ghibli
 Ferrari 250 GTO
 De Tomaso Mangusta
 Iso Grifo

References

External links

 Bizzarrini 5300 GT Strada, auto-classiche.it

Strada
Grand tourers
Front mid-engine, rear-wheel-drive vehicles
Cars introduced in 1964